The 2016–17 Swiss Super League, also known as Raiffeisen Super League for sponsoring purposes, was the 120th season of top-tier football in Switzerland and the 14th in the current format. Basel were the defending champions. The fixtures were published on 17 June 2016.

A total of 10 teams competed in the league: the 9 best teams from the 2015–16 season and the 2015–16 Swiss Challenge League champion Lausanne-Sport. The season started on the weekend of 23 and 24 July 2016 and ended on 2 June 2017.

On 28 April 2017, Basel won their 20th league title following their 2–1 away win against Luzern, with six games to spare. It is also their 8th consecutive title.

Teams

Stadia and locations

 This will be the first season since 1989–90 that there is only one club from Zürich to play in the first tier, because FC Zürich finished in last position and were relegated at the end of the 2015–16 season.

Personnel

 1Dabbur, who was on loan from Red Bull Salzburg, was called back by his parent club before he could play the last game of the season with Grasshopper.
 2The manager decided to give the captaincy to Maccoppi near the end of the season. Before that, Olivier Custodio was the captain.

Managerial changes

League table

Positions by round

Results

First and Second Round

Third and Fourth Round

Season statistics

Top goalscorers

Top assists

Hat-tricks

(H) – Home ; (A) – Away

Awards

Annual awards

Attendance

References

External links 
 
 
Swiss Super League at uefa.com

Swit
Swiss Super League seasons
1